Swift Current is a local service district and designated place in the Canadian province of Newfoundland and Labrador. Swift Current is located approximately 20 km south of Goobies.

Geography 
Swift Current is in Newfoundland within Subdivision K of Division No. 2. It is on Mouse Islet to the northeast of the Burin Peninsula between Grand Le Pierre and Goobies, 5 kilometres west of the Black River. The Burin Peninsula Highway (Route 210) passes through Swift Current.

Demographics 

Government 
Swift Current is a local service district (LSD) that is governed by a committee responsible for the provision of certain services to the community. The chair of the LSD committee is Ward Butt.

See also 
Burin Peninsula
List of designated places in Newfoundland and Labrador
List of local service districts in Newfoundland and Labrador

References 

Designated places in Newfoundland and Labrador
Local service districts in Newfoundland and Labrador